This is a current list of regiments and corps of the British Army.

Household Cavalry and Royal Armoured Corps

Household Cavalry
The Life Guards
The Blues and Royals (Royal Horse Guards and 1st Dragoons)

Line Cavalry
1st The Queen's Dragoon Guards
The Royal Scots Dragoon Guards (Carabiniers and Greys)
The Royal Dragoon Guards
The Queen's Royal Hussars (The Queen's Own and Royal Irish)
The Royal Lancers (Queen Elizabeth's Own)
The King's Royal Hussars
The Light Dragoons

Royal Tank Regiment
The Royal Tank Regiment

Yeomanry
The Royal Yeomanry
The Royal Wessex Yeomanry
The Queen's Own Yeomanry
The Scottish and North Irish Yeomanry

Infantry
When a regiment is given as n + n battalions, the first number is regular army battalions, and the second is Army Reserve battalions.

Foot Guards
Grenadier Guards - 1 + 0 battalion
Coldstream Guards - 1 + 0 battalion
Scots Guards - 1 + 0 battalion
Irish Guards - 1 + 0 battalion
Welsh Guards - 1 + 0 battalion
London Guards - 0 + 1 battalion

Line Infantry and Rifles
The Royal Regiment of Scotland - 3 + 2 battalions
The Princess of Wales's Royal Regiment (Queen's and Royal Hampshires) - 1 + 2 battalions
The Duke of Lancaster's Regiment (King's, Lancashire and Border) - 1 + 1 battalions
The Royal Regiment of Fusiliers - 1 + 1 battalions
The Royal Anglian Regiment - 2 + 1 battalions
The Yorkshire Regiment (14th/15th, 19th and 33rd/76th Foot) - 2 + 1 battalions
The Royal Welsh - 1 + 1 battalions
The Mercian Regiment (Cheshire, Worcesters and Foresters, and Staffords) - 1 + 1 battalions
The Royal Irish Regiment (27th (Inniskilling), 83rd, 87th and Ulster Defence Regiment) - 1 + 1 battalion
The Parachute Regiment  - 3 + 1 battalions
The Royal Gurkha Rifles - 2 + 0 battalions
The Rifles - 4 + 3 battalions
Ranger Regiment - 4 + 0 battalions

Other combat arms
Special Air Service 1 + 2 regiments
Special Reconnaissance Regiment 1 regiment
Army Air Corps 7 + 1 regiments

Combat Support
Royal Regiment of Artillery 15 + 6 regiments
Corps of Royal Engineers 15 + 7 regiments
Royal Corps of Signals 13 + 4 regiments
Intelligence Corps 3 + 4 battalions
Honourable Artillery Company 0 + 1 Regiment
Royal Monmouthshire Royal Engineers (Militia) 0 + 1 Regiment

Combat Service Support
Royal Army Chaplains' Department    
Royal Logistic Corps 13 + 11 regiments
Royal Army Medical Corps
Corps of Royal Electrical and Mechanical Engineers 8 + 3 battalions
Adjutant General's Corps 
Royal Army Veterinary Corps   
Small Arms School Corps   
Royal Army Dental Corps       
Royal Army Physical Training Corps    
General Service Corps   
Queen Alexandra's Royal Army Nursing Corps    
Royal Corps of Army Music

Overseas Regiments
Royal Gibraltar Regiment - 1 + 0 battalion
Royal Bermuda Regiment - 1 + 0 battalion
Royal Montserrat Defence Force
Cayman Islands Regiment - 0 + 1 battalion
Turks and Caicos Regiment - 0 + 1 battalion
Falkland Islands Defence Force - 0 + 1 company

Notes

Regiments